Maximilian II (28 November 1811 – 10 March 1864) reigned as King of Bavaria between 1848 and 1864.

Unlike his father, King Ludwig I, "King Max" was very popular and took a greater interest in the business of Government than in personal extravagance. Ascending the throne during the German Revolution of 1848, King Maximilian restored stability in his kingdom. The rest of his reign was characterized by attempts to maintain Bavarian independence during the wars of German Unification and to transform his capital city of Munich into a cultural and educational city.

Crown Prince
He was born in Munich and was the eldest son of the Crown Prince of Bavaria (later King Ludwig I) and his wife Therese of Saxe-Hildburghausen.

After studying at Göttingen and Berlin and travelling in Germany, Italy and Greece, he was introduced by his father into the council of state (1836). From the first he showed a studious disposition, declaring on one occasion that had he not been born in a royal cradle his choice would have been to become a professor. As crown prince, in the chateau of Hohenschwangau near Füssen, which he had rebuilt, he gathered about him an intimate society of artists and men of learning and devoted his time to scientific and historical study. The Wittelsbacher Palais was built for Maximilian as a Crown Prince Palace in Munich but only completed when he ascended the throne.

King

When the abdication of Ludwig I (20 March 1848) called him suddenly to the throne, his choice of ministers promised a liberal regime.

Domestic policy
In 1849 an uprising in the Bavarian Palatinate was broken down with the support of the Prussian Army.

Though from 1850 onwards his government tended in the direction of absolute monarchy,  King Maximilian steered a moderate course between the extremes of Classical Liberalism, Prussian-inspired Pan-Germanism, and the so-called "Ultramontanes".

In his attempts to transform Bavaria into a center of culture, education, and the arts, he enraged conservative Catholics and Protestants by inviting a number of celebrated men of learning (e.g. Geibel, Liebig, Heyse and Sybel) to Munich, regardless of their religious views.

Devoted to his family and his people, the King also financed studies of the art, costumes, dialects, and customs of the Bavarian peasantry. This was done in order to promote a separate national identity against Prussian-inspired Pan-Germanism.

In this, the King was assisted by his Personal Private Secretary, Franz Xaver von Schönwerth. A native of the Oberpfalz region of the Bavarian Kingdom, Ritter von Schonwerth's work collecting the folklore and traditions of his native district won him the admiration of the Brothers Grimm and made him a model for future folklore collectors.

Foreign policy
Maximilian II responded also to the demands of the people for a united German state, by attending the Frankfurt Assembly which intended to create such a state. The progress of the 1848 Revolution, however, gave him pause.  The king strenuously opposed the unionist plans of the Frankfurt Parliament, refused to recognize the imperial constitution devised by it, and assisted Austria in restoring the federal diet and in carrying out the federal execution in Hesse-Kassel and Holstein. In the aftermath of the failure of the Frankfurt Assembly, Prussia and Austria continued to debate of which monarchy had the inherent right to rule Germany. The dispute between Austria and the Electoral Prince of Hesse-Kassel (or Hesse-Cassel) was used by Austria and its allies (including Bavaria) to promote the isolation of Prussia in German political affairs. This diplomatic insult almost led to war when Austria, Bavaria and other allies moved troops through Bavaria towards Hesse-Kassel in 1850. However, the Prussian army backed down and accepted the principle of dual leadership. This event was known as the Punctation of Olmütz but also known as the "Humiliation of Olmütz" by Prussia. This event solidified the Bavarian kingdom's alliance with Austria against Prussia.

In his German policy Maximilian was guided by the desire to maintain the union of the princes. During the cold warfare between Austria and Prussia, King Maximilian and his ministers favored the former, which was a policy enthusiastically supported by both the Catholics and Protestants of the Bavarian Kingdom. Simultaneously, however, the King and his Ministers also attempted to preserve Bavaria's independence by trying to play both powers against each other. This policy continued under his son, King Ludwig II.

Attempts by Austria to reorganize the loose and entirely decentralised German Confederation, were opposed by Prussia and therefore the other German princes did not act on the reform proposals. The failure of these plans, and the attitude of the Austrian Court towards the Confederation and the Schleswig-Holstein Question, disillusioned King Maximilian. The last days of his reign were spent attempting to deal with the new situation created by the outbreak of the war with Denmark.

Later life
In the summers of 1849 and 1855, King Maximilian travelled his kingdom. Between 24 June and 27 July 1858, he undertook a journey on foot through his country, which began in Lindau. However, because of frequent rain he repeatedly had to be carried physically.

In government policy, the King repeatedly requested the advice of his ministers and scholarly experts before making a decision, which led to long delays. In addition, King Maximilian often traveled to Italy and Greece, which also led to long delays.

After a brief and unexpected illness, King Maximilian died at Munich on 10 March 1864. He is buried in the Theatinerkirche there.

Cultural legacy

Maximilian offered Paul Heyse and other writers from North Germany large stipends.
Hans Christian Andersen visited "King Max" (as he called him) in his castle Starnberg, and wrote of him as a young, highly amiable man. The King, having read his novels and fairy tales, let Andersen know that he was deeply impressed by The Improvisatore, En Digters Bazar, The Little Mermaid and Paradisets Have. During the visit Andersen also read The Ugly Duckling.
Later Andersen visited the King at the Schloss Hohenschwangau.

Next to Hohenschwangau Castle also the Hambach Castle was reconstructed from 1844 for Crown Prince Maximilian by August von Voit. In 1849 King Maximilian II instructed the architect Eduard Riedel to redesign Berg Castle in neo-gothic style with several towers and a crenellate.

Maximilian II was the principal of the Maximilianstrasse and the Bavarian National Museum in Munich. Compared to his father, Maximilian preferred a new architectural style with strong reference to the Gothic Revival architecture which would combine the best features of historical models combined with then modern building technology. The neo-gothic Royal Mansion in Regensburg was built for Maximilian 1854–1856, the Royal Mansion in Berchtesgaden and the Royal Villa on Rose Island already in 1853. The hiking path in Upper Bavaria called Maximiliansweg is named after him, as he made a longer hike in the Bavaria alps in the summer of 1858.
The Bavarian Maximilian Order for Science and Art was first established on 28 November 1853 by King Maximilian II.

Private life and family

While king, Maximilian was hampered by constant ill health which often compelled him to travel abroad and, when at home, to live much of the time in the countryside. The relationship with his father, who had persisted in his architectural projects even after his abdication, was mostly tense. By his wife, Marie Friederike Franziska Hedwig, daughter of Prince William of Prussia, who he married in 1842, he had two sons:
 Ludwig II of Bavaria (25 August 1845 – 13 June 1886)
 Otto, King of Bavaria (27 April 1848 – 11 October 1916)
both of whom became king, were declared insane, and deposed.

Honours

Ancestry

References

Works cited

External links

The King's portrait

1811 births
1864 deaths
19th-century Kings of Bavaria
House of Wittelsbach
Princes of Bavaria
Burials at the Theatine Church, Munich
Knights of the Order of Saint Joseph
Knights of the Golden Fleece of Austria
Grand Crosses of the Order of Saint Stephen of Hungary